Carlos Contreras may refer to:

Sports

Football
 Carlos Contreras (footballer, born 1938) (1938–2020), Chilean football defender
 Carlos Contreras (footballer, born 1972), Venezuelan footballer
 Carlos Contreras (footballer, born 1991), Honduran footballer
 Carlos Contreras (footballer, born 1995), Chilean football midfielder 
 Carlos Herrera Contreras (born 1983), Chilean footballer

Other sports
 Carlos Contreras (baseball) (born 1991), Dominican baseball pitcher
 Carlos Contreras (racing driver) (born 1970), Mexican NASCAR driver
 Carlos Alberto Contreras (born 1973), Colombian road cyclist
 Aníbal, Carlos Ignacio Carrillo Contreras (1940–1994), Mexican professional wrestler

Other people
 Carlos Contreras Aponte, Puerto Rican civil engineer
 Carlos López Contreras, Honduran politician
 Vittorio Vidali (1900–1983), also known as Carlos Contreras, Italian communist militant and politician

See also